Mastre may refer to:

 Mastre (title), a title used for medical doctors in Cyprus, see History of medicine in Cyprus
 Mastre-Pavajeau House, Valledupar, Cesar, Colombia; a noted architectural landmark, see Architecture of Cesar Department
 Angel Mastre, Jr. (politician), a Philippine Liberal party candidate in the 2016 Zambales local elections
 Richard Master aka Richard Mastre (died 1588), personal doctor of Queen Elizabeth I of England

See also

 Mastrevirus
 Mastress, feminine form of title
 Meister
 Maistre
 Maitre
 Master (disambiguation)
 Maestro (disambiguation)
 Magister (disambiguation)